Champaran or Champaranya formerly known as Champajhar  named after forests of Champa Flowers which are extinct from here is a village in the Raipur District in the state of Chhattisgarh, India, which lies about 60km from the state capital of Raipur via Arang and 30 Km from Mahasamund Via Bamhani, Tila. It is famous because it is the birth place of Jagadguru shrimad Vallabhacharya Mahaprabhu

The village is identified with Champaranya and therefore has religious significance as the birthplace of the Jagadguru Mahaprabhu Vallabhacharya, the reformer and founder of the Vallabh sect also known as Pushtimarg. A temple has been constructed in his honour. Near this is a temple of Champeshwar Mahadeva. There are two Baithaks of Vallabhacharya's Chaurasi Bethak here.

Champaran word derivation 
The Champaran is derived from the Champa Flower. There is a myth that in past Champaran was a forest of Champa Flowers. So, on this myth, the place first named Champajhar (Chmapa+Jhar; Jhar means house) then it named Champaran from Champaranya (its ancient name, meaning house of Champa Flowers)

Attractions

There are two temples dedicated to Shri Mahaprabhuji in Champaran. The first one is known as Prakatya Baithakji Mandir, where seva is performed by HDH Param Pujya Goswami 108 Shri Dwarkeshlalji Maharajshri and HDH Param Pujya Goswami 108 Shri Purshottamlalji Maharajshri. The second Baithakji is Mool Prakatya that is normally known as Chhatti Baithak. In this temple seva is done by Goswami shri Vallabhlalji and Shri Raghunathlalji (Shri Pinky Bawa) of 5th house of Kamvan. Apart from this there is a Haveli temple dedicated to Shree Girirajji and Shree Balkrishnalalji. A small stream of Mahanadi River flows near the temple which is believed to be from Yamuna river and worshipped. Mahaprabhuji's Prakatya Utsav is celebrated every year on eleventh day of Baisakh and many of followers of the sect gather at the temple to pay homage. The Annual Fair of Champaran  is held with great festivities in the month of Magh every year. Large number of Pushtimargiya Vaishnavs visit Champaran every year.
 The Champeswar Madadev Temple haves rare shivling which had dedicatd to Lord Shiv, Parvati and Ganesh.

Transport
Champaran is accessible from Raipur both via Arang.  From the junction of Arang-Rajim Road at the village of Jonda,  there is  a paved road  to Champaran. Buses are available from Raipur and Arang. Nearest Railway Station Is Mahasamund Railway Station

References

External links
 Temples near Champaran
 Tours to Champaran
 Photo of temple

Tourism in Chhattisgarh
Villages in Raipur district